"Closer to Heaven" is a song recorded by American country music artist Mila Mason.  It was released in November 1997 as the first single from the album The Strong One.  The song reached #31 on the Billboard Hot Country Singles & Tracks chart.  The song was written by Aimee Mayo and Bill Luther.

Chart performance

References

 

1997 singles
1997 songs
Mila Mason songs
Songs written by Bill Luther (songwriter)
Songs written by Aimee Mayo
Atlantic Records singles